Gerhard Wack (born 21 August 1945) is a German politician. He served as the State Secretary in the Ministry of Finance of the federal state Saarland from 1999 to 2012.

Born in Saarlouis, Wack studied law at Saarland University in Saarbrücken. He is married and has a daughter.

References

1945 births
Living people
20th-century German politicians
21st-century German politicians
Jurists from Saarland
People from Saarlouis
Political office-holders in Saarland
Saarland University alumni